Latifa bint Abdulaziz Al Saud was a member of the House of Saud. Her mother was Hassa bint Ahmed Al Sudairi, a member of the Al Sudairi family that is one of the most powerful families in Nejd. Her father was King Abdulaziz. She was one of their eleven children together, a full-sister of the Sudairi Seven. Latifa married Khalid bin Turki bin Ahmed bin Mohammed Al Sudairi. She patronised universities.

Ancestry

References

Latifa
Latifa
Latifa
Year of birth missing (living people)